Hemmestveit is a surname. Notable people with the surname include:

Mikkjel Hemmestveit (1863–1957), Norwegian-American Nordic skier 
Torjus Hemmestveit (1860–1930), Norwegian Nordic skier 

Norwegian-language surnames